Jahanabad (also Romanized as Jahānābād; also known as Jahānābād-e ‘Alī Ashraf) is a village in Salehabad Rural District, Salehabad County, Razavi Khorasan Province, Iran. At the 2006 census, its population was 51, in 15 families.

References 

Populated places in   Torbat-e Jam County